The Chinese Society for Rock Mechanics & Engineering (abbreviated  CSRME) is a professional body and learned society in the field of rock mechanics in China with a focus on water conservation and hydropower, geology and mining, railway transport, national defense engineering, disaster control, environmental protection. As of 2018, it has 6 subordinate working committees, 13 specialized committees, 12 branches, 19 local societies, and 12,674 individual members. It is a constituent of the China Association for Science and Technology (CAST) and a member of the International Society for Rock Mechanics (ISRM).

History
The Chinese Society for Rock Mechanics & Engineering started in 1978 as NG China in the International Society for Rock Mechanics (ISRM). The preparatory committee was founded in 1981 and it was officially established in June 1985.

Scientific publishing
 Chinese Journal of Rock Mechanics and Engineering

List of presidents

References

External links
 

Geotechnical organizations
Rock mechanics
Scientific organizations established in 1985
Organizations based in Beijing
1985 establishments in China